Nord Nord Mord is a 2011 German crime film series produced by ZDF. From 2011 until 2018, Robert Atzorn played the role of Chief Inspector Theo Clüver in eight episodes. The first episode with Peter Heinrich Brix as Commissioner Carl Sievers (the ninth in total) was broadcast on October 15, 2018.

Plot 
At the Sylt detective agency, the edgy chief inspector Theo Clüver is more inclined to solve cases with empathy, patience and instinct rather than using modern investigative methods. His colleague, Ina Behrendsen, approaches the cases objectively, austerely and without emotion, while Hinnerk Feldmann, who comes from the Baltic Sea, stands out with his know-it-all attitude.

After Clüver's (Atzorn's) retirement, his position was taken over by the rather reserved and uncommunicative chief inspector Carl Sievers, who was transferred from Kiel to Sylt and combines a professional approach with an alert mind. However, he seems to be also carrying a health burden.

Cast 
Leading actor Robert Atzorn left the series at his own request after the eighth episode, Clüver and the Silent Death. His successor was Peter Heinrich Brix.

List of episodes

DVD releases 

 Episodes 1–3 released April 10, 2015
 Episodes 4–5 released March 17, 2017
 Episodes 6–8 released March 23, 2018
 Episodes 9–10 released January 10, 2020
 Episodes 11–12 released January 8, 2021
 Episodes 13–14 released April 23, 2021
 Episodes 15–16 released January 28, 2022
 Episodes 17 and later have not been released on DVD yet.

Reception 
In the Frankfurter Allgemeine Zeitung, the journalist Michael Hanfeld judged the film series on December 20, 2021 (the 16th episode's first broadcast) as exemplary for the television films shown on German public television. The films in the series predominantly gave the impression of “a crime series in the Rosamunde Pilcher style, full of clichés, predictable in plot and character development, with subtle dialogue jokes and a soft pop soundtrack [...], a classic example of the solid television film escapism that is in the program of ARD and ZDF plays a major role.”

External links 

 
 Nord Nord Mord at fernsehserien.de
 ZDF Press Portal: Nord Nord Mord

References 

Crime television series
2020s television series
2010s television series